Pınar Saka (born 5 November 1985) is a Turkish female track running athlete in the sprint discipline competing in the categories 100 m, 200 m and 400 m. She is the Turkish national record holder for 400 m.
This time is the first time a Turkish woman ran under 52 seconds and also a qualifying mark for Olympics that will be held in London in 2012.
She was chosen as Regional Athlete of the Year in Midwest both in 2008 and 2009. There were 8 regional athletes nominated for "National Athlete of the Year" award and in 2009, she receiveds that honor.

Saka was born in Üsküdar, Istanbul. She studied international business at the University of Nebraska at Omaha in the USA.

Saka participated at the 2005 Mediterranean Games in Almería, Spain in the categories 4x100 m relay, 400 m and 4x400 m relay. She ran bronze medal in the 4x400 m relay in 3:40.75 with her teammates Birsen Bekgöz, Özge Gürler and Binnaz Uslu.

In 2011 Saka won the silver medal at the 26th Summer Universiade in Shenzhen together with a team consisting of Nagihan Karadere, Merve Aydın and Meliz Redif, with a time of 3.31.05.

Saka qualified for participation in the 400 m event at the 2012 Summer Olympics.

She is doing her MBA degree at Boğaziçi University in Istanbul.

Doping 
Pınar Saka was in 2013 sanctioned as a result of abnormalities detected in her biological passport. She was disqualified from 18 June 2010 and got three years ineligibility ending 23 May 2015.

Achievements
Her personal best performances are: 
 100 m 11.93 (2003)
 200 m 23.97 (2003)
 200 m Indoor 23.90
 400 m 51.53 (2011) NR
 400 m Indoor 52.99 (2011) NR

NR: Turkish national record

References

1985 births
Doping cases in athletics
Turkish sportspeople in doping cases
Living people
Turkish female sprinters
Enkaspor athletes
Sportspeople from Istanbul
University of Nebraska alumni
Boğaziçi University alumni
Olympic athletes of Turkey
Athletes (track and field) at the 2012 Summer Olympics
Mediterranean Games bronze medalists for Turkey
Athletes (track and field) at the 2005 Mediterranean Games
Universiade medalists in athletics (track and field)
Mediterranean Games medalists in athletics
Universiade silver medalists for Turkey
Medalists at the 2011 Summer Universiade
Olympic female sprinters